Alister Spence is an Australian jazz pianist and composer.

Spence leads the Alister Spence Trio with Lloyd Swanton and Toby Hall. They were nominated for the ARIA Award for Best Jazz Album in 2004 for Flux and in 2007 for Mercury.

Bands and artists he has recorded with include the Raymond MacDonald International Big Band, Clarion Fracture Zone, Wanderlust, Australian Art Orchestra, Andrew Robson, and Carl Orr.

He was a composer for numerous Ivan Sen films including Journey, Tears, Vanish, Wind, Dust, Shifting Shelter, Yellow Fella, A Sister’s Love and Beneath Clouds. For the latter Sen and Spence were nominated for the 2002 AFI Award for Best Original Music Score and the FCCA Award for Best Music Score. Other films he has composed for include Molly and Mobarak, Dakiyarr versus the King, Spirit Stones, and In My Father’s Country.

Discography

Albums

Awards and nominations

AIR Awards
The Australian Independent Record Awards (commonly known informally as AIR Awards) is an annual awards night to recognise, promote and celebrate the success of Australia's Independent Music sector.

|-
| AIR Awards of 2010
|Fit 
| Best Independent Jazz Album
| 
|-

ARIA Music Awards
The ARIA Music Awards is an annual awards ceremony that recognises excellence, innovation, and achievement across all genres of Australian music. They commenced in 1987. 

! 
|-
| 2004
| Flux (Alister Spence Trio)
| Best Jazz Album
| 
|rowspan="2"| 
|-
| 2007
| Mercury (Alister Spence Trio)
| Best Jazz Album
| 
|-

References

External links
Official site

Australian jazz pianists
Living people
Year of birth missing (living people)
Wanderlust (jazz band) members
Clarion Fracture Zone members